, also , is a mountain located in Shizuoka Prefecture, Japan. It is located in the southern part of the Akaishi Mountains, which are known as the "Southern Alps" (南アルプス Minami-Alps). It is located in the Minami Alps National Park
.

Arakawa 3 mountains 
Mount Warusawa, Mount Arakawa-Naka and Mount Arakawa-Mae are called Arakawa 3 mountains.

References 
 Geographical Survey Institute

See also
 List of mountains in Japan
 100 Famous Japanese Mountains
 Three-thousanders (in Japan)
 Akaishi Mountains
 Minami Alps National Park

War
Mount Warusawa
Warusawa
Mount Warusawa